Juan De Dios Vega De León (born 30 October 1998) is a Mexican professional footballer who plays as a defender.

References

External links

 

1998 births
Living people
Association football defenders
Mineros de Zacatecas players
Alebrijes de Oaxaca players
Atlético Morelia players
Footballers from Oaxaca
Ascenso MX players
Liga de Expansión MX players
Raya2 Expansión players
Mexican footballers